Aref Rostami (born May 1, 1996) is an Iranian footballer who plays for Persian Gulf Pro League club Mes Kerman.

Club career

Kheybar Khorramabad
Rostami joined Kheybar Khorramabad in the summer of 2020. Rostami scored 17 times in 28 matches in 2020–21, and became the league's top scorer.

Zob Ahan
On 24 August 2021, He joined Zob Ahan on a one-year contract.

Mes Kerman
Rostami joined Mes Kerman in August 2022. He made his debut on 19 August 2022 against Paykan.

Honours
Individual
 Azadegan League top scorer: 2020–21 (17 goals)

References

1996 births
Living people
Iranian footballers
Association football wingers
Azadegan League players
Persian Gulf Pro League players
Saipa F.C. players
Niroye Zamini players
Zob Ahan Esfahan F.C. players
Sanat Mes Kerman F.C. players